Ahmet Dağtekin was the head of the pro-Kurdish Democratic People's Party in Turkey. In July, along with Handan Çağlayan, he was convicted in a Halfeti court for using the Kurdish language during a 2004 campaign event. Dağtekin was sentenced to a 6-month prison term by the court, in addition to a fine of $326 (440 lira). The rulings were under appeal at year's end.

References

Leaders of political parties in Turkey
Living people
Democratic People's Party (Turkey) politicians
Turkish Kurdish politicians
Year of birth missing (living people)